Maria Ludwiga Michalk (born 6 December 1949) is a German politician. She was a member of the German Bundestag from 1990 to 1994 and from 2002 to 2017 as a member of the Christian Democratic Union (CDU) party.

Biography
She was born in Merka in Radibor municipality and attended the local Sorbian high school. She trained as an industrial clerk and then studied business economics at a technical college.

She became a member of the East German Christian Democratic Union (CDU) in 1972. In 1990, she was named to the CDU district council for Bautzen district. In 1990, she was elected to the Volkskammer. She was subsequently elected to the Bundestag later that year. After leaving the Bundestag in 1994, she managed an education centre in Bischofswerda for seven years. In 2002, she was elected to the Bundestag again. In 2016, she announced that she would not run for reelection to the Bundestag in 2017.

Michalk was awarded the Sächsische Verfassungsmedaille and was named to the Order of Merit of the Federal Republic of Germany.

References

External links

1949 births
Living people
People from Bautzen (district)
Sorbian people
Christian Democratic Union (East Germany) politicians
Members of the 10th Volkskammer
Members of the Bundestag for Saxony
Recipients of the Cross of the Order of Merit of the Federal Republic of Germany
Members of the Bundestag 2013–2017
Members of the Bundestag 2009–2013
Members of the Bundestag 2005–2009
Members of the Bundestag 2002–2005
Members of the Bundestag for the Christian Democratic Union of Germany